The following highways are numbered 713:

Costa Rica
 National Route 713

India
 National Highway 713 (India)

United States
 Florida State Road 713
 Georgia State Route 713 (former)
 Maryland Route 713
 Mississippi Highway 713
 Puerto Rico Highway 713